Jordan Brown (born 11 October 1991) is an English footballer who plays as a left-back for Bishop's Stortford. A former West Ham United youth player, Brown has played on loan with Aldershot and completed a short-term contract with Crewe Alexandra, as well as playing for Barnet for over two seasons, Boreham Wood, Whitehawk, Dulwich Hamlet, Welling United, Concord Rangers, Canvey Island and East Thurrock United.

Early life
He played football as a schoolboy for Kingdown Rangers in his hometown of Benfleet and was spotted playing in an under-8 team.

Career
Brown joined West Ham as a youth team player for the 2007–08 season. He signed his first professional contract, with West Ham, in the summer of 2010. In August 2011 he signed a one-month loan deal with Aldershot Town. Brown made his debut on 3 September 2011 in a 1–0 home win against Cheltenham Town. Brown was released by West Ham in January 2012.

On 27 February 2012 Brown signed for Crewe Alexandra on a one-month contract.

On 27 June 2012 Brown signed for League Two side Barnet. He started the 2012–13 season as first choice, but lost his place to Elliot Johnson, making 25 appearances in all competitions that season. In 2013–14, following Barnet's relegation to the Conference Premier, Brown had dropped to third choice behind Johnson and Mauro Vilhete, making only three further appearances, before being released on 24 February 2014. Upon leaving the club, he said "Even though I've not played as much football as I would have liked I've enjoyed my time at Barnet Football Club... I'm at a stage in my career where I need to be playing regularly and because of the club's excellent strength in depth it's not been possible at The Hive." Brown joined Bishop's Stortford four days later. In September 2014, Brown had trials with Luton Town. Although the Hatters decided not to sign Brown, they helped facilitate a move to Boreham Wood for him, signing on 3 October 2014.

Brown made one appearance for Whitehawk against Bath City on 15 August 2015, before moving to Dulwich Hamlet towards the end of September 2015, making his debut in a 3-1 Isthmian League Premier away win over Metropolitan Police on 29 September 2015.

After finishing the 2015–16 season with Dulwich, making 36 appearances in all competitions for the club, Brown joined Welling United ahead of the 2016–17 season. He joined Concord Rangers on loan in October 2016, where he made six appearances. Brown joined the Beachboys permanently for the 2017–18 season. He then joined Canvey Island for 2018–19. The following season he joined East Thurrock United. He then joined Bishop's Stortford.

Personal life
Brown is a cousin of Fulham footballer Kieran Richardson.

Career statistics

References

External links

1991 births
Living people
English footballers
Association football defenders
West Ham United F.C. players
Aldershot Town F.C. players
Crewe Alexandra F.C. players
Barnet F.C. players
Bishop's Stortford F.C. players
Boreham Wood F.C. players
Whitehawk F.C. players
Dulwich Hamlet F.C. players
Welling United F.C. players
Concord Rangers F.C. players
Canvey Island F.C. players
East Thurrock United F.C. players
English Football League players
National League (English football) players
Isthmian League players
Black British sportspeople
People from South Benfleet